Christian Vilhelm Wilcken (Wilken) Kyhl (1762-1827) was a Danish gunsmith and inventor. He served as Royal Armourer (Rustmester) at the Arsenal in Copenhagen and headed the Kronborg Small Arms Factory at Helsingør. He owned the property at Ny Vestergade 9 in Copenhagen from 1797 and until his death.

Biography
Kyhl was born in Helsingør. 
On 11 September 1797, he purchased the property at Ny Vestergade 9 in Copenhagen from engraver Hans Qvist. He lived on the first floor in the front wing and his workshop was based in the eastern side wing. It had six employees.

Kyhl married  Ane Elisabeth Hansen (1769-1808) in circa 1809. They had five children: Marie Sophie (1799-1833), Abigael Margrethe (1801-), Thomas Herman (1803-1820), Frederik (1805-1874) and twin sisters Dorothea Johanne (1805-) and Cicilie Christiane (1806-). His wife died in 1808 and he was then married second time to Ane Dorothea Hansen (1776-1814) in July 1809, and had three more daughters: Ane Elisabeth Abigael (1810-1848), Ane Christiane (1814-) and Christiane Margrethe (1812, died as an infant). His second wife died in labour just 37 years old in 1819. Kyhl died in September 1827 and was buried from the Church of Our Lady.

Legacy

Kyhl's most significant invention was an internal gun lock. Small arms manufactured by him are relatively rare but occasionally sold by auction houses.

His former property at Ny Vestergade 9 in Copenhagen was listed in the Danish Registry of Protected Buildings and Places in 1932. The relief of two crossed pistols above the gate was installed by him.

Further reading
 Askgaard, Finn :Rustmester Christian Wilcken Kyhl : bøssemager og opfinder, Tøjhusmuseet, Copenhagen, 148 pages (1975)

References

External links
 Image
 Kronborg Geværfabrik

Gunsmiths
19th-century Danish inventors
People from Helsingør
1762 births
1827 deaths